|}

The Sussex Stakes is a Group 1 flat horse race in Great Britain open to horses aged three years or older. It is run at Goodwood over a distance of 1 mile (1,609 metres), and it is scheduled to take place each year in late July or early August.

History
The first version of the event, a 6-furlong race for two-year-olds, was established in 1841. It continued intermittently for thirty-seven years, but it was uncontested on twenty-five occasions including fourteen walkovers.

The Sussex Stakes became a 1-mile race for three-year-olds in 1878. The previous version had been overshadowed by both the Goodwood Cup and the Stewards' Cup, but in its modified form it became the most prestigious race at Goodwood.

The event was opened to four-year-olds in 1960, and to horses aged five or older in 1975.

The race is currently held on the second day of the five-day Glorious Goodwood meeting.

Records
Most successful horse (2 wins):
 Frankel – 2011, 2012

Leading jockey (8 wins):
 Sir Gordon Richards – Marconigram (1928), Corpach (1936), Pascal (1937), Radiotherapy (1946), Combat (1947), Krakatao (1949), Le Sage (1951), Agitator (1952)

Leading trainer (7 wins):
 Sir Henry Cecil – Bolkonski (1975), Wollow (1976), Kris (1979), Distant View (1994), Ali-Royal (1997), Frankel (2011, 2012)

Leading owner (7 wins): 
 Sue Magnier – Among Men (1998), Giant's Causeway (2000), Rock of Gibraltar (2002), Henrythenavigator (2008), Rip Van Winkle (2009), The Gurkha (2016)
 Khalid Abdullah – Rousillion (1985), Warning (1988), Distant View (1994), Frankel (2011, 2012), Kingman (2014)

Winners

There was no race in 1915, 1916, 1917, 1918, 1940, 1942, 1943, 1944 and 1945. The 1941 race was run at Newmarket.

See also
 Horse racing in Great Britain
 List of British flat horse races

References
 Paris-Turf:
 Racing Post:

 galopp-sieger.de – Sussex Stakes.
 ifhaonline.org – International Federation of Horseracing Authorities – Sussex Stakes (2019).
 pedigreequery.com – Sussex Stakes – Goodwood.
 

Flat races in Great Britain
Goodwood Racecourse
Open mile category horse races
Recurring sporting events established in 1841
British Champions Series
Breeders' Cup Challenge series
1841 establishments in England